Candia was a ship of the Dutch East India Company (Dutch: Vereenigde Oost-Indische Compagnie; VOC) which only once traveled for Asia in 1790 and never returned to the Netherlands.

Construction

History
On 26 October 1790 the Candia left Europe from the island of Goeree for its travel to Batavia under the command of captain Dirk Dirksz Varkevisser (1758-1805), who previously had command over the VOC ship Middelwijk in 1786 and 1787. The ship left with 186 people on board. It arrived for a stop at Cape Town on 13 February 1791, disembarking 20 persons. On the passage to Cape Town 3 persons had perished. Departing on 23 March 1791, it finally arrived in Batavia on 15 June 1791, where it was sold in 1796 and broken up.

Visible remainder
The Dutch maritime painter Gerrit Groenewegen (1754-1826) created a depiction of the Candia in 1789, while still in Dutch waters near Rotterdam, giving a good impression of the appearance of the Dutch Spiegelretourschip in those days.

Citations

References

External links
Candia original books from 1790
 Information at Huygens ING
 Scan of Bruijn,  J. R. (2011) on Google Books, Retrieved 27 February 2020

1788 ships
Age of Sail merchant ships of the Dutch Republic
Ships of the Dutch East India Company